Ogbaru is a local government area in Anambra State, south-central Nigeria. The area's local government headquarters is in the port city of Atani.

History 
Ogbaru people are farmers as well as known warriors from its history; the Ogbaru people share clan lineage and boundaries with Anioma people in Delta State and Ndoni people in Rivers State.

Economy 
Ogbaru has a Nigerian naval base, an industrial river harbor, a refinery, a federal road under-construction leading to Rivers State in Nigeria. Ogbaru is a projected link road to other parts of the southeast and south zones of Nigeria with construction of more inland link roads and the construction of a Second Niger bridge.

Geography 
The Ogbaru people consider the Niger-River waters that run through its region as their territorial lands. Ogbaru is surrounded by river Niger to the west, from okpoko town to Ogwu-ikpele boundary with Rivers state (west end) and the Orashi River to the East along Ogwu-aniocha and Osomari forest reserve (east end), Ogbaru boundary with Ihiala and goes up to Okija, Ihiala, Owerri Onitsha road, also borders Ozubulu, Oraifite and Oba to its northeast.

Climate
The shallow depth of the River makes the area subject to frequent flooding due to heavy rainfall in the rainy season which impacts local farms and crops. A major flood in 2018 killed 12 people and polluted nearby rivers.  In 2020, a major flood displaced 1000 people and again impacted farms in the region.

Towns within the region include Atani, Akili-Ogidi, Akili-Ozizor, Amiyi, Mputu, Obeagwe, Ohita, Odekpe, Ogbakugba, Ochuche Umuodu, Ossomala/Ossomari, Ogwu-aniocha, Umunankwo, Umuzu, Okpoko, and Ogwu-Ikpele. Ogbaru is neighbored to the north by Onitsha, a major commercial city in Nigeria also located in Anambra State.

Ogbaru is an Igbo clan that stretched into three Nigerian states, Anambra State, Delta State and Rivers State in Nigeria. Ogbaru was a food basket in Biafra country, during the civil war.(But little logistics for distribution across the war torn land).Civil war never came to Ogbaru it was inaccessible by road, or air, and covered in forest.

2022 Flooding 

The overflow of River Niger and downpour in the past few days fuelled the rise of the water level.Houses, farmlands, markets and business houses have been swallowed by the flood.flood has taken over places like Ogwu Ikpele, Akili Ogidi, Obeagwe, Ossomala, Umunankwo, Ogbakuba, Ochuche, Akili Ozizor, Atani, Ohita, Odekpe, Amiyi, Iyiowa, Ogbeukwu, Okoti, Ochuche Umuodu and parts of the slum Okpoko near the commercial city of Onitsha.Total number of 76 citizens living in flood-ravaged areas Ogbaru were drowned when their boat  capsized trying to leave their flooded homes. According to the National Emergency Management Agency (NEMA), Ogbaru has the highest number of victims with 286,000 persons.
One of the impact of the flood is house collapse causing death in the community.

Education 
Secondary schools in Ogbaru Local Government Area include Ogbaru High School, Ogbakuba Ideke Grammar Secondary School, odekpe Unity Comprehensive Girls’ High School, Okpoko Community Boys’ Secondary School, Okpoko Community Girls’ Secondary School, Okpoko Community Secondary School, Atani Government Technical College, Osomala Community Secondary School, Odekpe Josephine Oduah Memorial Secondary School, and Akili-Ozizor Anthony Obaze Memorial Community Secondary School, Ochuche Umuodu.

People 
Notable people and personalities from Ogbaru include:

 Oseloka H. Obaze, diplomat and author, born in Ochuche Umuodu
 Stella Oduah, Nigerian Senator and former Minister of Aviation, born in Akili-Ozizor
 Omu Okwei, the "Merchant Queen of Osomari", born in the region in 1872
 Oscar N. Onyema, chief executive officer of the Nigerian Stock Exchange, from Ogwu-Ikpele
 Chief Stephen Osita Osadebe, Igbo highlife musician, born in Atani

References

Further reading
LOCAL GOVERNMENT AREAS IN ANAMBRA STATE dated July 21, 2007; accessed October 4, 2007

Local Government Areas in Anambra State
Local Government Areas in Igboland